Curra Parish, New South Wales is a civil parish of Gordon County, New South Wales, a Cadastral divisions of New South Wales.

The  parish is on the Macquarie River and Curra Creek. The town of (west) Wellington, New South Wales is at the northern end of the parish and is the main land use feature of the parish. The Dubbo Railway Line passes through the parish.

References

Parishes of Gordon County (New South Wales)